Fretz Farm was a historic house and farm complex located in Doylestown Township Township, Bucks County, Pennsylvania. It had five contributing buildings and one contributing structure. They were the farmhouse, barn, carriage house, small barn / corn crib, old barn, gazebo, and pump house.  The buildings were in the Italianate style.

It was added to the National Register of Historic Places in 1985.  It was delisted in 2012.

References

Farms on the National Register of Historic Places in Pennsylvania
Italianate architecture in Pennsylvania
Houses in Bucks County, Pennsylvania
1812 establishments in Pennsylvania
National Register of Historic Places in Bucks County, Pennsylvania